Line 8 of the Guangzhou Metro is a north-west L-shaped line on the system that runs from  to , spanning a total of  with 28 stations. All stations on Line 8 are underground. Line 8's color is teal.

Line 8 used to run as part of Line 2 until the extension to both lines opened for trial operation on 25 September 2010, and Changgang to Fenghuang Xincun started operation on 3 November 2010. With the northern extension of Line 8, daily ridership is projected to immediately reach 960,000 passengers per day, growing to 1.33 million per day in the short term and topping 1.65 million per day in the long-term.

History

 2004 - The Line 2 and 8 realignment project; and Line 8 Cultural Park to Xiaogang extension was announced. Creating Line 8 by splitting off the southeastern portion (Xiaogang to Wanshengwei) from Line 2.
 June 2007 - Line 2 and 8 realignment; and Line 8 phase 1 (Cultural Park to Xiaogang extension) was approved by the NDRC.
 1 August 2007 - Construction of Line 2 and 8 realignment project; and Line 8 phase 1 extension officially commenced.
 10 March 2010 - Line 8 phase 2 (northern extension) was announced by extend Line 8 from Liwan to Baiyun.
 21 September 2010 - Line 2's services of train bound between Sanyuanli to Wanshengwei ends.
 25 September 2010 - Line 2 and 8 realignment project; and Line 8 phase 1 extension first section was completed and enter operation.
 3 November 2010 - Line 2 and 8 realignment project; and Line 8 phase 1 extension second section enter operation.
 9 July 2014 - Line 8 phase 3 (further north extension) was announced by further extend Line 8 from Baiyun to Huadu.
 28 December 2019 - The section from Cultural Park to Fenghuang Xincun was opened.
 26 November 2020 - The section from Cultural Park to Jiaoxin was opened, except for Xicun and Caihongqiao stations.
 28 September 2022 - Caihongqiao station was opened.
 28 December 2022 - Xicun station was opened.

Stations

Further North Extension
Part of Phase 3 adjustment plan of Guangzhou Metro, now under review by the National Development and Reform Commission as of September 2022. This extension will bring Line further North beyond Jiaoxin Station. The extension will have provisions to be divided into two lines at Jiangfu Station. With the northern section of Line 8 between Jiangfu Station and Guangzhou North Railway Station will be spun off to form the new Line 24.

However, according to the latest environmental impact assessment announcement, Line 24 is used as an extension of Line 8 to announce the line design information. The part to the north of Jiangfu Station is taken as part of the further north extension of Line 8, and the part to the south of Jiangfu Station is taken as the "Subline of the North Extension of Line 8". Even so, the line specifications of these two parts are still configured according to the separate Line 24, because it avoids the need to increase the number of new service lines when it is submitted to the National Development and Reform Commission for approval.

East Extension
Under planning. The extension is 18 km with 8 new stations.

References

08
Railway lines opened in 2010
1500 V DC railway electrification